Rock Camp: The Movie is a 2021 documentary film about Rock 'n' Roll Fantasy Camp, an interactive music event involving professional musicians.

Synopsis 
Rock Camp: The Movie follows a group of attendees as they travel to Rock 'n' Roll Fantasy Camp to play music with and learn from professional musicians such as Paul Stanley of Kiss, Judas Priest, and Dave Mustaine of Megadeth, among others. Throughout the duration of camp, the attendees partake in an array of activities, navigate and conquer fears and goals, and ultimately perform live at a nearby venue. Subjects addressed in the film include disability, comeback stories, and musical accomplishments, among others. Additionally, the film tells the story of Rock 'n' Roll Fantasy Camp founder David Fishof, and how he transitioned from a sports agent to a music producer, and ultimately founded Rock Camp.

Cast 
 Teddy Andreadis, rockstar counselor
 Vinny Appice, rockstar counselor
 Sebastian Bach, rockstar headliner
 Jeff Beck, rockstar headliner
 William Brewster, music supervisor
 Jerry Cantrell, rockstar headliner
 Alice Cooper, rockstar headliner
 Scott 'Pistol' Crockett, camper
 Roger Daltrey, rockstar headliner
 Jason Ebs, rockstar counselor
 Spike Edney, rockstar counselor
 Richie Faulkner, rockstar headliner
 Tammy Fisher, camper
 David Fishof, Rock Camp founder
 Lita Ford, rockstar counselor
 Tony Franklin, rockstar counselor
 Sammy Hagar, rockstar headliner
 Rob Halford, rockstar headliner
 Rick Harrison, camper
 Warren Haynes, rockstar headliner
 Gary Hoey, rockstar counselor
 Mike Inez, rockstar headliner
 Scott Keller, camper
 Bruce Kulick, rockstar counselor
 Meat Loaf, guest
 Blake Meinhardt, camper
 Dave Mustaine, rockstar headliner
 Tanya O'Callaghan, rockstar counselor
 Joe Perry, rockstar headliner
 Rudy Sarzo, rockstar counselor
 Miles Schuman, camper / Q&A Host
 Gene Simmons, rockstar headliner
 Slash, rockstar headliner
 Paul Stanley, rockstar headliner
 Nita Strauss, rockstar counselor
 Brian Wilson, rockstar headliner
 Nancy Wilson, rockstar headliner
 Chip Z'Nuff, rockstar counselor

Reception 

Articles and reviews of the film were featured in national publications including Rolling Stone, USA Today, Billboard, among others.

Rock Camp won Best Music and Arts Film at the 2020 Key West Film Festival.

The film received a 89% rating on Rotten Tomatoes based on 18 reviews.

In April 2021, comedian Jimmy Fallon was quoted as saying he "loved" the documentary on The Tonight Show.

References

External links 

2021 documentary films
2021 films
Documentary films about music festivals
2020s English-language films